State Route 84 (SR 84) is a north–south state highway in eastern Middle Tennessee. It originates at Sparta on U.S. Route 70 (US 70), goes through the town of Monterey, and ends on the west side of Livingston along SR 85.

Route description

White County

SR 84 begins as a secondary highway in downtown Sparta, in White County, at a junction with  US 70/SR 1. It then follows a northeasterly path to through some rural farmland before entering some mountains and crossing into Putnam County.

Putnam County

SR 84 then becomes very curvy before it intersects and becomes concurrent with US 70N/SR 24, where it becomes a primary highway, and enters Monterey.

US 70N/SR 84/SR 24 then intersect I-40 (Exit 300) before entering downtown Monterey. In downtown, US 70N/SR 24 split off and turn south, while SR 84 continues to an intersection with SR 62, where it makes a sharp left turn and goes northeast, leaving Monterey.

Overton County

SR 84 then becomes curvy as it enters Overton County to intersect with SR 293. It then continues northwest through mountainous terrain and farmland before entering Livingston. SR 84 has an overpass interchange with SR 111 before coming to an end on the west side of Livingston at a junction with SR 85. A former alignment saw the last mile of SR 84 routed slightly farther north to a terminus at SR 111 approximately a half mile north of the current SR 84/SR 111 interchange.

Major intersections

References 

084
084
084
084